Tasting the Tears is the ninth album by Italian progressive metal band Eldritch, released in 2014 via Scarlet Records.

Track listing 
"Inside you" - 5:57
"Tasting the tears" - 6:07
"Alone again" - 5:08
"Waiting for something" - 3:21
"Seeds of love" - 4:12
"The trade" - 4:14
"Something strong" - 4:24
"Don't Listen" - 3:42
"Iris" - 3:29
"Love from a stone" - 3:41
"Clouds" - 4:34
"I Will Remember (Queensrÿche cover)" - 4:05

2014 albums
Eldritch (band) albums
Scarlet Records albums